Gabriel Leis Veiga (born 7 May 1950) is a Spanish retired footballer who played as a defender, and later worked as a manager.

Playing career

Leis was born in Santiago de Compostela, the capital of the autonomous community of Galicia, and began his career with SD Compostela. He later joined Pontevedra, being part of the team that was promoted as 1975–76 Tercera División group winners. He played 36 matches in the Segunda División the following season, before Pontevedra were relegated to the brand new Segunda División B. They suffered relegation again, back to the Tercera División, in 1980–81, and went on to win their group for the next two seasons, without achieving promotion. Leis left in 1983 to join Lalín, with whom he won a fourth Tercera División group in 1984–85, and endured another Segunda División B relegation a year later.

Managerial career

After his retirement, Leis returned to Compostela as a coach. He took over as first team manager in March 1998 after the departure of Fernando Vázquez, with the club in the La Liga relegation play-off places. Leis guided them to victory in five of their remaining 11 matches, but they still finished the season in 17th, and faced a relegation play-off against Villarreal. A 0–0 draw at El Madrigal was followed by a 1–1 draw at home at San Lázaro, meaning Compostela lost on away goals and were relegated to the Segunda División after four years in the top flight.

Leis was replaced by Antonio Maceda ahead of the new season, but Macedo lasted just nine games before departing in October with Compostela 13th in the Segunda División table. After Pichi Lucas acted as interim manager for three games, Leis returned as manager in late November. He was in charge for 15 matches, winning six, but despite improving the club's league position to 8th he left his position in March 1999. Compostela would total five managers that season, with Zoran Marić and Andoni Goikoetxea both taking the reins after Leis's departure.

For the 2003–04 season Compostela, who had by now slipped into Segunda División B, appointed Pichi Lucas as their permanent manager, but he departed in January with the club second from bottom. After one match with Franck Passi in interim charge, Leis took over for his third spell as manager. Compostela won just five of their remaining 18 matches, and were relegated to the Tercera División in 19th place. Financial problems, which had meant players refused to play one of their matches against Conquense due to unpaid wages, also led to Compostela being demoted another step to Regional Preferente de Galicia, and Leis left the club.

Leis returned to management in January 2008, taking over at San Isidro in Segunda División B. He won only one of his 10 matches in charge, and lost eight, before departing in March with the club bottom of the table. The rest of the season was no better, and they were relegated in last place.

Honours

Player
Pontevedra
Tercera División: 1975–76, 1981–82, 1982–83

Lalín
Tercera División: 1984–85

Career statistics

As a player

As a manager

References

External links

1950 births
Living people
Spanish footballers
Footballers from Santiago de Compostela
Association football defenders
Segunda División players
Segunda División B players
Tercera División players
SD Compostela footballers
Pontevedra CF footballers
Spanish football managers
La Liga managers
Segunda División managers
Segunda División B managers
SD Compostela managers